"All Eyes On Me" is a song by South African rapper and record producer AKA featuring Burna Boy, Da L.E.S and JR, released as the fifth single from his second studio album Levels. The song is produced by award-winning producer Tweezy. On 30 November 2016, "All Eyes On Me" was certified Platinum by the Recording Industry of South Africa.

Composition
"All Eyes On Me" contains a sample of "Got a Love For You (Hurley's House Mix)" as performed and written by Jomanda.

Music video
The music video was released on AKA's Vevo account on December 10, 2014 and has over 2 million views. The video features guest appearance of Cashtimelife YouTube.

Remix 

On July 30, 2015, the official Dancehall/Afrobeats infused remix of "All Eyes On Me" was released, featuring Burna Boy, Stonebwoy, and Redsan.

Accolades

All Africa Music Awards

References

External links 
Lyrics of this song at Genius

2014 songs
2014 singles
South African hip hop songs
AKA (rapper) songs
Song recordings produced by Tweezy
Songs written by Burna Boy